Bakit Hindi Ka Crush ng Crush Mo? is a 2013 Filipino film adaptation of Ramon Bautista's self-help book of the same name. The romantic comedy film is produced by Star Cinema and is part of its 20th Anniversary presentation. It tells the story of a brainy ugly duckling girl and her journey as she turns into someone who's worth loving. Ramon Bautista also stars in the film as a taxi driver. It is the first movie team up of Kim Chiu and Xian Lim and is directed by Joyce Bernal.

Synopsis
Sandy Veloso (Kim Chiu) is a modern-day ugly duckling who is obsessed with her boyfriend Edgardo (Kean Cipriano). After he breaks with her, Sandy is left to ponder why she feels unwanted.

Matters turn worse for Sandy when she is laid off by her company, under the leadership of its new bachelor CEO, Alex Prieto (Xian Lim). Realizing his mistake when employees belatedly put in a good word for Sandy, Alex hires her back, and the two start forming an unlikely friendship.

In a love story about "the ugly duckling in all of us and how we turn into someone worth loving," Alex at one point even offers Sandy a make-over so she will no longer cry over a failed relationship.

Cast
Kim Chiu as Sandy Veloso
Xian Lim as Francisco Alejandro "Alex" Prieto
Kean Cipriano as Edgardo "Gardo" Salazar
Mylene Dizon as Pamela
Freddie Webb as Don Antonio Prieto
EJ Jallorina as Max Veloso
Ramon Bautista as himself / taxi driver
Cholo Barretto as Nathan
Ashley Robert Corbette as Ashly
Anika Mendez as Nikky
Cedric Lucero as Ceddy
Jojit Lorenzo as Julius
Cheska Iñigo as Patty Prieto
Sarah Gaugler as Liza
Bianca Valerio as Bianca Valerio
Jeremiah Sird as Eric Rodney

Special participation
Tonton Gutierrez as Miguel Prieto
Angeline Quinto as Tangerine
Pokwang as Cora Veloso
 Dianne Medina
 Jireh Lim as himself
 Lilia Cuntapay
 Dawn Jimenez

Promotion
Actors Kim Chiu and Xian Lim became guests to several ABS-CBN TV shows to promote the film. Among these are Gandang Gabi Vice and Banana Split.

Theme song

Bakit Hindi Ka Crush ng Crush Mo?, sung by Zia Quizon and written by Jungee Marcelo, is the theme song of the movie. It premiered on July 8, 2013, on the FM radio station MOR 101.9 For Life! and was released as a single on July 17. It is also included in her second studio album, A Little Bit of Lovin'''.

Music video
The music video for the song was released on ABSstarcinema's YouTube channel on July 23, 2013. The video's plot features Quizon at a photo shoot session while being pursued by a man who works on set, played by Ramon Bautista, the author of the book to which the film is primarily based.

Accolades
The song won at the 27th Awit Awards for the Awit Award for Best Song Written for Movie/TV/Stage Play on December 12, 2014.

Critical reception

Bakit Hindi Ka Crush ng Crush Mo? mostly received positive reviews from critics. Jerald uy of Uy.com stated that "Bakit Hindi Ka Crush ng Crush Mo? reminds us of the stupid things we can do for love but offers it in a fresh way." The movie was given an 8.5/10 "certified fresh" from both moviegoers and movie critics alike.

Commercial performance
The film became a certified box-office success after it earned 10.5 million php on its first day. Both National and International screenings had to be extended due to high demand which showed how successful the team-up is. Nationally, the gross income reached 180 million php (not including international gross). After three weeks of its theatrical run, the film grossed over 100 million php. The movie surpassed Hollywood flicks that were released long with it. Among these films were Despicable Me 2, Percy Jackson: Sea of Monsters and The Wolverine''.

References

External links

Official Website

2013 films
2010s films
Star Cinema films
Philippine romantic comedy films
2013 romantic comedy films
Films directed by Joyce Bernal
Filipino-language films